Chassell is an unincorporated community in Chassell Township of Houghton County in the Upper Peninsula of the US state of Michigan. It is located on Pike Bay at the south end of Portage Lake  and is the largest community in the township.

Chassell is known for the Copper County Strawberry Festival which is always the weekend after the 4th of July.  https://web.archive.org/web/20101028121554/http://einerlei.com/community/strawFest/home.html

Demographics

History
In 1855, the land that included what was to become Chassell was acquired from the state of Michigan by the St. Mary's Canal and Land Company. In 1863, Francis Jacker built one of the first buildings in the area, a log cabin close to the mouth of the Sturgeon River. In 1867, John Chassell (1814–1883) of New York, purchased farmland from the St. Mary's Canal and Land Company where the community is now located. In 1865, Chassell was influential in raising the $160,000 capital with which the First National Bank of Houghton was founded. Chassell served as the first Cashier of the bank. He was also a founding member of a major contributor to the Houghton County Historical Society and Mining Institute.

Chassell sold his land in 1881 to Orrin W. Robinson, manager of the Sturgeon River Lumber Company and later Lieutenant Governor of Michigan. Robinson lived in Chassell's home until later building a new one on the same lot.  The company was established in 1872 and owned large tracts of land in the area and with mill operations in Hancock. The owners of that company also organized the Sturgeon River Boom Company in 1875, which dug a canal to bring logs from the Sturgeon to Pike Bay. To accommodate expansion, the mills and principal operations were moved from Hancock to Chassell in 1887-88. By that time, the Duluth, South Shore and Atlantic Railway had extended a line to the area with a stop at Chassell. The first post office was established there in February 1888.

On April 14, 1888, Chassell Township was organized. The name was taken from the community, which had been named in honor of John Chassell by Robinson. The area had at first been known simply as Pike's Bay and later as Robinson. However, there was at that time another post office with the name Robinson in Ottawa County, Michigan and postal regulations did not allow two offices with the same name in the same state.

Education
The high school building was built in 1912 and, together with a 1917 elementary school, has been on the National Register of Historic Places since 2009 as the Chassell School Complex. In 1992, the schools were moved to Chassell Township School, which serves as a K-12 public school.

Transportation
Indian Trails bus lines operates daily intercity bus service between Hancock, Michigan and Milwaukee, Wisconsin.

Images

References

Dates in the History of Chassell, Michigan
Chassell Michigan is Named in honor of John Chassell

Unincorporated communities in Houghton County, Michigan
1887 establishments in Michigan
Unincorporated communities in Michigan
Census-designated places in Houghton County, Michigan
Census-designated places in Michigan